The Seaford Football Netball Club, nicknamed the Tigers, is an Australian rules football and netball club based in the south eastern region of Australia, first organised in late 1921. Formation meetings were held at Armstrong's Grocery Store, Martins Garage and Weatherley's Milk Bar.

The football team currently competes in the Mornington Peninsula Nepean Football League. The netball department began at the club in 2011. The club also introduced women's football in 2013.

At end of the 2016 season, Seaford FNC fielded three men's, four netball and three women's football sides.

The highest profile player to come out of Seaford is retired St Kilda player and Brownlow Medallist Robert Harvey.

At the end of the 2018, Seaford FNC came last in the newly created First Division of MPNFL, finishing with 2 wins, 14 losses and 2 draws, and therefore were relegated to Second Division

Men's football premierships

Netball premierships

Women's football premierships

VFL/AFL players

 Fred Davies, Carlton, 125 games
 Robert Elphinstone, St Kilda, 157 games
 Anthony Harvey, St Kilda, 4 games
 Robert Harvey, St Kilda, 1988–2008, 383 games (215 goals)
 Eric White, South Melbourne, 21 games
 Brian Woinarski, St Kilda, 41 games
 Steve Arnott, Melbourne, 1 game
 Ron Battams, St Kilda, 3 games
 Aaron Edwards, West Coast, North Melbourne, Richmond, 2003–14
 Damian McCormack, Western Bulldogs, 4 games, 2005–07
 Marcus Marigliani, Essendon, 2 games, 2010
 Jack Lonie, St Kilda, 2015–present
 Mitchell White, Melbourne, 2015–present

Bibliography
 History of the Seaford Football Club - Mark Pearson

References

External links
 Official site

Australian rules football clubs in Victoria (Australia)
1921 establishments in Australia
Mornington Peninsula Nepean Football League
Netball teams in Victoria (Australia)
Sport in the City of Frankston